Dúbravka is a village and municipality in Michalovce District in the Košice Region of eastern Slovakia.

History
In historical records the village was first mentioned in 1409.

Geography
The village lies at an altitude of 106 metres and covers an area of  (2020-06-30/-07-01).

Population 
It has a population of 684 people (2020-12-31).

Ethnicity
The population is 98% Slovak in ethnicity.

Government

The village relies on the tax and district offices, and fire brigade at Michalovce and relies on the police force at Trhovište.

Culture
The village has a small public library, a post office, and a food store.

Sports
The village has a football pitch.

Transport
The village has a bus and railway station.

Genealogical resources

The records for genealogical research are available at the state archive "Statny Archiv in Presov, Slovakia"

 Roman Catholic church records (births/marriages/deaths): 1850-1895 (parish B)
 Greek Catholic church records (births/marriages/deaths): 1756-1904 (parish A)
 Reformated church records (births/marriages/deaths): 1761-1896 (parish B)

See also
 List of municipalities and towns in Slovakia

References

External links
https://web.archive.org/web/20071217080336/http://www.statistics.sk/mosmis/eng/run.html
Surnames of living people in Dubravka

Villages and municipalities in Michalovce District
Zemplín (region)